La Courtine (Auvergnat: La Cortina) is a commune in the Creuse department in the Nouvelle-Aquitaine region in central France.

Geography
The commune is within the natural park of Millevaches, (1000 lakes, not cows).

History

La Courtine military camp
The foundation of the camp in 1904 transformed the town: the inhabitants remained peasants during the day but became bar-keepers at night and soon there were more bars than inhabitants.

Population

Sights
 The thirteenth-century church.
 A watermill in the village of Lair.
 Eleventh-century defensive mottes at Cinq Mottes.
 A military camp, established in 1904, housing up to 4000 soldiers, site of the 1917 mutiny by troops of the Russian Expeditionary Force in France.
 The thirteenth-century churches at the hamlets of Saint-Denis and at Trucq.

See also
Communes of the Creuse department
Regional nature parks of France

References

Communes of Creuse
County of La Marche